Gravonaut is a scrolling platform game for iOS by Canadian developer Nexus Game Studio. Released in 2010, it was updated in 2011 to include "Virtual Reality" levels.

Reception
iFanzine said that the game does a superb job on putting a twist on the traditional platformer. Arcadelife praised its 8-bit graphics and difficult gameplay.

References

2010 video games
IOS games
IOS-only games
Platform games
Single-player video games
Video games developed in Canada